Cina Munch (born 17 June 1971) is a Fijian former swimmer. She competed in four events at the 1988 Summer Olympics.

References

External links

1971 births
Living people
Fijian female swimmers
Olympic swimmers of Fiji
Swimmers at the 1988 Summer Olympics
Place of birth missing (living people)
20th-century Fijian women
21st-century Fijian women